The Baykar Bayraktar Kızılelma (English: Red Apple) is a single-engine, low-observable, carrier-capable, jet-powered unmanned combat aerial vehicle, currently in development by Turkish defence company Baykar. The aircraft is being developed as part of Project MIUS (English: Combatant Unmanned Aircraft System). The first version of Bayraktar Kızılelma (Kızılelma-A) is subsonic, however both future versions of Bayraktar Kızılelma (Kızılelma-B and Kızılelma-C) will be supersonic, the latter having twin engine configuration. 

Baykar CTO Selçuk Bayraktar had initially announced that the Kızılelma was expected to make its maiden flight in 2023, adding that a jet-powered UCAV was a "12-year-long dream". However, the Kızılelma was able to complete its first flight ahead of the expected date, on 14 December 2022.

Development 
The first conceptual studies for Bayraktar MIUS started in 2013. The most important development regarding the project took place on 20 July 2021. On this date, the first design images and information about the characteristics of the aircraft were shared with the public.

Engine selection 
AI-322F Turbofan Engine Supply Agreement and AI-25TLT Turbofan Engine Integration Agreement were signed between Baykar and Ukrainian Ivchenko-Progress at the SahaExpo event on November 11, 2021. While the first prototypes will go at subsonic speeds using AI-25TLT engines, the next prototypes are expected to be supersonic with AI-322F engines.

Disclosure of the project name 
The code name of the project was initially MIUS ( - English: Combatant Unmanned Aircraft System). Its official name, Kızılelma; which means Red Apple in Turkish, was shared with the public on March 12, 2022.

Prototypes 
On the same day of the name disclosure, Selçuk Bayraktar revealed that the first Kızılelma prototype has entered the assembly line. The first ready-to-fly prototype was displayed to the public in Teknofest 2022.

Beginning of the testing process 
 The first engine integration test was successfully conducted on September 19, 2022.
 On November 20, 2022, automatic taxiing and ground running tests were carried out.
 Take-off test flights began on December 3, 2022 and Kızılelma cut its wheels off the ground for the first time.
 The aircraft made its maiden flight on December 14, 2022.
 The drone successfully made its second flight in mid-January.

Design

Body 
The Kızılelma is an unmanned aircraft featuring a low-RCS supersonic airframe equipped with an AESA radar.  The aircraft is powered by a turbofan engine fed by two air inlets; yaw control is achieved with two vertical stabilizers. The aircraft has coupled-canard controls for increased maneuverability or better controlling the main wing airflow. Internal compartments will allow the aircraft to operate in contested environments while sustaining low observability.

The aerodynamic controls feature canards-delta configuration, previously only seen on certain stealth aircraft such as Chengdu J-20 and AVIC Dark Sword. The canards offer a trade-off between relatively less stealth but great maneuverability. Some control measures could be implemented to reduce its impact on radar signature.

Carrier capability 
The aircraft is designed in a way that makes it capable to takeoff and land on an amphibious assault ship, such as TCG Anadolu, without any need for a catapult system.

Variants 
During Teknofest 2022, Baykar announced that there will be at least 3 variants of Kızılelma with different engine configurations. The engines are produced by the Turkish-Ukrainian joint venture Black Sea Shield.  Kızılelma-A will be capable of near-supersonic speeds, being powered by the AI-25TLT engine. Kızılelma-B will fly at supersonic speeds, powered by a single Ukrainian AI-322F engine. And lastly Kızılelma-C will incorporate 2 AI-322F engines.

While there are expectations to make use of Turkish-made Tusaş Engine Industries TF6000 turbofan engines in the future, nothing has been confirmed so far.

Features 
 Fully-autonomous takeoff and landing
 Low radar cross-section
 High maneuverability
 Line Of Sight (LOS) and Beyond LOS (BLOS) controlled
 Takeoff and landing capability from short-runway aircraft carriers
 High situational awareness with AESA radar
 Internal weapons bays

Operators

Future operators of Bayraktar Kızılelma 
 [Unknown]

 Turkish Air Force 
 Turkish Navy

Specifications (Kızılelma-A)

See also
 AVIC Dark Sword
 Boeing MQ-28 Ghost Bat
 Kratos XQ-58 Valkyrie
 HAL Combat Air Teaming System
 Boeing MQ-25 Stingray

References

Stealth aircraft
Unmanned stealth aircraft
Single-engined jet aircraft
Unmanned military aircraft of Turkey

International unmanned aerial vehicles